Gentoo may refer to:
 Gentoo penguin, a species of bird.
 Gentoo Linux, a computer operating system distribution named after the penguin.
 Gentoo (file manager), a free file manager for Linux and other Unix-like systems.
 Gentoo (term), an alternative, archaic name of the Telugu language, or a historical, archaic term for Hindus.
 Gentoo Code, a document translated from Sanskrit regarding inheritance laws in Hinduism.